NVC community CG2 (Festuca ovina - Avenula pratensis grassland) is one of the calcicolous grassland communities in the British National Vegetation Classification system. It is one of three short-sward communities associated with heavy grazing, within the lowland calcicolous grassland group, and is regarded as "typical" chalk grassland.

It is a comparatively widely distributed community. There are four subcommunities.

Community composition

The following constant species are found in this community:
 Meadow Oat-grass (Avenula pratensis)
 Quaking-grass (Briza media)
 Glaucous Sedge (Carex flacca)
 Sheep's Fescue (Festuca ovina)
 Mouse-ear Hawkweed (Hieracium pilosella)
 Crested Hair-grass (Koeleria macrantha)
 Rough Hawkbit (Leontodon hispidus)
 Fairy Flax (Linum catharticum)
 Bird's-foot Trefoil (Lotus corniculatus)
 Ribwort Plantain (Plantago lanceolata)
 Salad Burnet (Sanguisorba minor)
 Small Scabious (Scabiosa columbaria)
 Wild Thyme (Thymus praecox)

The following rare species are also associated with the community:

 Man Orchid (Aceras anthropophorum)
 Ground-pine (Ajuga chamaepitys)
 Purple Milk-vetch (Astragalus danicus)
 Great Pignut (Bunium bulbocastanum)
 Rare Spring Sedge (Carex ericetorum)
 Dwarf Sedge (Carex humilis)
 Soft-leaved Sedge (Carex montana)
 Dwarf Mouse-ear (Cerastium pumilum)
 Tuberous Thistle (Cirsium tuberosum)
 Chalk Eyebright (Euphrasia pseudokerneri)
 Slender Bedstraw (Galium pumilum)
 Limestone Bedstraw (Galium sterneri)
 Early Gentian (Gentianella anglica)
 Chiltern Gentian (Gentianella germanica)
 Musk Orchid (Herminium monorchis)
 Spotted Cat's-ear (Hypochaeris maculata)
 Wild Candytuft (Iberis amara)
 Perennial Flax (Linum perenne subsp. anglicum)
 Late Spider-orchid (Ophrys fuciflora)
 Early Spider-orchid (Ophrys sphegodes)
 Monkey Orchid (Orchis simia)
 Burnt Orchid (Orchis ustulata)
 Broomrape (Orobanche picridis)
 Round-headed Rampion (Phyteuma tenerum)
 Dwarf Milkwort (Polygala amara)
 Chalk Milkwort (Polygala calcarea)
 Pasqueflower (Pulsatilla vulgaris)
 Meadow Clary (Salvia pratensis)
 Field Fleawort (Senecio integrifolius ssp. integrifolius)
 Moon Carrot (Seseli libanotis)
 Nottingham Catchfly (Silene nutans)
 Autumn Ladies'-tresses (Spiranthes spiralis)
 Cut-leaved Germander (Teucrium botrys)
 Bastard-toadflax (Thesium humifusum)
 Large Thyme (Thymus pulegioides)
 Spiked Speedwell (Veronica spicata)

Distribution

This community is found in lowland limestone grassland throughout England and Wales.

Subcommunities

There are four subcommunities, one of which is subdivided into three variants:
 the Cirsium acaule - Asperula cynanchica subcommunity, subdivided into:
 a typical variant
 a Filipendula vulgaris - Helinathemum nummularium variant
 a Pseudoscleropodium purum - Prunella vulgaris variant
 the Succisa pratensis - Leucanthemum vulgare subcommunity
 the Holcus lanatus - Trifolium repens subcommunity
 the Dicranum scoparium subcommunity

References

 Rodwell, J. S. (1992) British Plant Communities Volume 3 - Grasslands and montane communities  (hardback),  (paperback)

CG02